Emiel De Haes (born 2 August 1955) is a Belgian racing cyclist. He rode in the 1979 Tour de France.

References

1955 births
Living people
Belgian male cyclists
Place of birth missing (living people)